COO Boutique Hostel & Sociatel is a hostel located along Outram road, within the Tiong Bahru district in Singapore. It is Singapore's first 'Sociatel' brand. The entity is known for their architectural design, being awarded the "Visual Identity of the Year" at Ahead Asia Awards 2017. The project occupies 752 square meters and was completed in 2016.

References

Hotels in Singapore